In enzymology, a nicotianamine synthase is an enzyme that catalyzes the chemical reaction

3 S-adenosyl-L-methionine  3 S-methyl-5'-thioadenosine + nicotianamine

Hence, this enzyme has one substrate, S-adenosyl-L-methionine, and two products, S-methyl-5'-thioadenosine and nicotianamine.

This enzyme belongs to the family of transferases, specifically those transferring aryl or alkyl groups other than methyl groups.  The systematic name of this enzyme class is S-adenosyl-L-methionine:S-adenosyl-L-methionine:S-adenosyl-Lmethioni ne 3-amino-3-carboxypropyltransferase.

References

 

EC 2.5.1
Enzymes of unknown structure